Kraikitti In-utane (born March 1, 1989), simply known as Do, is a Thai professional footballer who plays as a striker for Samut Sakhon in the Thai League 2.

International career
Kraikitti has represented Thailand U-20 in the 2007 AFF U-20 Youth Championship.

Under-19

Honours
Individual
 AFF U-19 Youth Championship top scorer: 2007

External links
 Profile at Goal

1989 births
Living people
Kraikitti In-utane
Kraikitti In-utane
Association football midfielders
Kraikitti In-utane
Kraikitti In-utane
Kraikitti In-utane
Kraikitti In-utane
Kraikitti In-utane
Kraikitti In-utane
Kraikitti In-utane
Kraikitti In-utane